Columella (in plants) is an axis of sterile tissue which passes through the center of the spore-case of mosses. In fungi it refers to a centrally vacuolated part of a hypha, bearing spores. The word finds analogous usage in myxomycetes.

The term columella is also used to refer to story 1 to story 4 (S1 – S4) cells in the root cap, located apically of the quiescent centre.

References

Plant anatomy